Alan Barrow (born 23 January 1955) is a South African former first class cricketer. He was the second player in List A history to score a double hundred.

External links

1955 births
Living people
People from Mthatha
South African cricketers
KwaZulu-Natal cricketers
Gauteng cricketers
Cricketers from the Eastern Cape